Rajdeo Singh (4 October 1908 – 25 February 1984 ) was an Indian politician. He was elected to the Lok Sabha, the lower house of the Parliament of India from the Jaunpur constituency in Uttar Pradesh in 1962, 1967 and 1971 as a member of the Indian National Congress.

References

External links
 Official biographical sketch in Parliament of India website

Lok Sabha members from Uttar Pradesh
1908 births
1984 deaths
India MPs 1962–1967
India MPs 1967–1970
India MPs 1971–1977
People from Jaunpur district
Indian National Congress politicians